The Black Hills are a small and low mountain range in the northern Peninsular Ranges System, in Riverside County, southern California.

They are located east of the city of Temecula. Oak Mountain is to the south of the hills.

See also
Ceanothus ophiochilus (Vail Lake ceanothus) — endemic to the hills area.

References 

Peninsular Ranges
Mountain ranges of Riverside County, California
Temecula, California
Hills of California
Mountain ranges of Southern California